Artemisia glauca is a species of flowering plant in the family Asteraceae, native from eastern Europe to Mongolia and Western Himalaya. It was first described in 1831. Some sources regard it as the subspecies glauca of Artemisia dracunculus.

References

glauca

Plants described in 1831